In mathematics, a Malcev algebra (or Maltsev algebra or Moufang–Lie algebra) over a field is a nonassociative algebra that is antisymmetric, so that

and satisfies the Malcev identity

They were first defined by Anatoly Maltsev (1955).

Malcev algebras play a role in the theory of Moufang loops that generalizes the role of Lie algebras in the theory of groups.  Namely, just as the tangent space of the identity element of a Lie group forms a Lie algebra, the tangent space of the identity of a smooth Moufang loop forms a Malcev algebra.  Moreover, just as a Lie group can be recovered from its Lie algebra under certain supplementary conditions, a smooth Moufang loop can be recovered from its Malcev algebra if certain supplementary conditions hold.  For example, this is true for a connected, simply connected real-analytic Moufang loop.

Examples
Any Lie algebra is a Malcev algebra.
Any alternative algebra may be made into a Malcev algebra by defining the Malcev product to be xy − yx.
The 7-sphere may be given the structure of a smooth Moufang loop by identifying it with the unit octonions.  The tangent space of the identity of this Moufang loop may be identified with the 7-dimensional space of imaginary octonions.  The imaginary octonions form a Malcev algebra with the Malcev product xy − yx.

See also

Malcev-admissible algebra

Notes

References

Non-associative algebras
Lie algebras